The 2019 Big South men's basketball tournament was the postseason men's basketball tournament that ended the 2018–19 season of the Big South Conference. It was held from March 5 through March 10, 2019 at various campus sites. Gardner–Webb defeated Radford 76–65 in the championship game to win the tournament, and received the conference's automatic bid to the NCAA tournament. It was the first title for Gardner–Webb after 11 years in the Big South, and their first trip to the NCAA Tournament in school history.

Sites 
The first round was played at campus sites at the home of the higher seed. The quarterfinals and semifinals were played at Gore Arena in Buies Creek, North Carolina, home of regular-season champion Campbell. The championship game was held at the Dedmon Center in Radford, Virginia, the home arena of the highest surviving seed, Radford.

Seeds
All 11 conference teams were eligible for the tournament. The top five teams received a first-round bye. Teams were seeded by record within the conference, with a tiebreaker system to seed teams with identical conference records.

Schedule

Bracket

References

External links
2018 Big South Men's Basketball Championship

Tournament
Big South Conference men's basketball tournament
Big South Conference men's basketball tournament
Big South Conference men's basketball tournament
Big South Conference men's basketball tournament